Hochdorf is one of the two former municipalities that were combined to form the municipality of Hochdorf-Assenheim in Rhein-Pfalz-Kreis in Rhineland-Palatinate, Germany.  It is located in the southwestern part of the municipality, with the Marlach river crossing the northern edge.

History 

Until the French Revolution, Hochdorf belonged to the Bishopric of Speyer. After the Congress of Vienna in 1815, Hochdorf initially belonged to the Austrian Empire and then moved to the Kingdom of Bavaria in 1816. From 1886, Hochdorf was part of the newly created Bezirksamts Ludwigshafen. In 1928 Hochdorf had 776 inhabitants, who lived in 139 residential buildings. The Catholics had their own parish, while the Protestants belonged to that of Meckenheim. Since 1938, the village has been part of the Ludwigshafen district (Landkreises Ludwigshafen), which has been called Rhein-Pfalz-Kreis since 2004. After the Second World War, Hochdorf was part of the then newly formed state of Rhineland-Palatinate within the French occupation zone.

References

External links 

 Official Website of Dannstadt-Schauernheim, which contains Hochdorf.

Rhein-Pfalz-Kreis
Former municipalities in Rhineland-Palatinate